Du Jinran (born 12 May 1986) is a Chinese retired goalball player. He won a gold medal at the 2008 Summer Paralympics.

He developed visual impairment during middle school.

References

Male goalball players
1986 births
Living people
Sportspeople from Beijing
Paralympic goalball players of China
Paralympic gold medalists for China
Goalball players at the 2008 Summer Paralympics
Goalball players at the 2012 Summer Paralympics
Medalists at the 2008 Summer Paralympics
Paralympic medalists in goalball
Beijing Union University alumni